Once Upon a Kiss is a 2015 Philippine television drama romance comedy series broadcast by GMA Network. Directed by Joyce E. Bernal, it stars Bianca Umali and Miguel Tanfelix. It premiered on January 5, 2015 on the network's Telebabad line up replacing Strawberry Lane. The series concluded on May 1, 2015 on with a total of 83 episodes. It was replaced by Let the Love Begin in its timeslot.

Cast and characters

Lead cast
 Bianca Umali as Mariella "Ella" Servando Rodrigo
 Miguel Tanfelix as Prince Pelaez Almario

Supporting cast
 Michael de Mesa as Enrique "King" Pelaez
 Mylene Dizon as Giselle Pelaez-Almario
 Cris Villanueva as Eric Almario
 Tessie Tomas as Mérida Almario
 Manilyn Reynes as Aurora Servando-Rodrigo
 Nova Villa as Adelaida "Adela" Servando
 Maricar de Mesa as Ursula Salazar
 Sabrina Man as Wendy Salazar
 Mariel Pamintuan as Athena Almario
 Luigi Revilla as John 
 Miggy Jimenez as Mickey Abueva
 Nicole Dulalia as Lily
 Jenny Alvarez as Amber Monteverde
 Eunice Lagusad as Melody Catacutan

Recurring cast
 Betong Sumaya as Sebastian Poblador
 Frank Magalona as Hans Peligro 
 Valerie Concepcion as Minnie Servando-Rodrigo 
 Cai Cortez as Fiona Allegre
 Ana Roces as Daisy
 Pekto as Badong
 Ping Medina as Sido
 Sherilyn Reyes-Tan as Jasmine
 Tina Paner as Sophia
 Ramon Christopher as Renato

Guest cast
 Al Tantay as Pedring Servando
 Keempee de Leon as Jimmy Rodrigo
 Gabby Eigenmann as Philip Madasalin
 Chuckie Dreyfus as Luis Montenegro  
 Orestes Ojeda as Adolfo Pelaez
 Elijah Alejo as young Athena Pelaez 
 Rochelle Pangilinan as Rapunzel Pelaez-Almario 
 Marc Justine "MJ" Alvarez as young Mickey Abueva
 Joshua Lichtenberg as young Prince Pelaez-Almario
 Hershey Garcia as young Mariella "Ella" Servando-Rodrigo
 Zandra Summer as Giselle's secretary
 Carme Sanchez as Nelly
 Mosang as Mimay
 Ashley Cabrera as Fifi

Ratings
According to AGB Nielsen Philippines' Mega Manila household television ratings, the pilot episode of Once Upon a Kiss earned a 19.8% rating. While the final episode scored a 23.2% rating. The series had its highest rating on April 28, 2015 and May 1, 2015 with a 23.2% rating.

References

External links
 
 

2015 Philippine television series debuts
2015 Philippine television series endings
Filipino-language television shows
GMA Network drama series
Philippine romantic comedy television series
Television shows set in the Philippines